The pardine genet (Genetta pardina), also known as the West African large spotted genet, is a genet species living in West Africa. As it is widely distributed and common, it is listed as Least Concern on the IUCN Red List.

Characteristics
The pardine genet's fur is yellowish grey with round black spots, which are bigger on the hind legs than on the shoulders. Its head is more reddish, and the muzzle brownish. It has white spots under each eye and below the chin. Its ears are grey. Its tail has six to seven narrow white and six to seven broader black rings. The tip of the tail is black.

Distribution and habitat
Pardine genets are distributed from Senegal eastwards to Ghana, where the Volta River is possibly a barrier to dispersal. They live in rainforests, gallery forests, moist woodlands, but also in plantations. They also venture into suburbs.

Ecology and behavior 
Pardine genets are solitary, and active at night. They are very adept at climbing trees.

Threats 
Major threats to pardine genets are not known. Heads and skins of pardine genets have been recorded in local markets in Benin, where they are used as fetish.

In captivity
Captive pardine genets are currently kept in 5 collections in the UK, Shepreth Wildlife Park, Wingham Wildlife Park, All Things Wild, Wild Animal Adventures in Stockton and Wild Discovery in Wrea Green. Napoli Zoo in Italy has also kept them since 2015.

Taxonomy
This pardine genet was considered synonymous with other species of large-spotted genets, namely the Rusty-spotted genet Genetta maculata and the Cape Genet Genetta tigrina, but all three are now each recognised as distinct species.

References

pardine genet
Mammals of West Africa
pardine genet